Zanthoxylum piasezkii is a tree from the family Rutaceae.

Description

Classification
The species was published Trudy Imperatorskago S.-Peterburgskago Botaničeskago Sada in 1889.  It would later be accepted in 2008's Flora of China.

References

piasezkii
Flora of China